The Lover is a fiction film produced and directed by Mahmoud Shoolizadeh, that has participated in several international film festivals in 2016 and 2017. The film was mainly shot in St. Mary's, Georgia, and was screened at locations such as the historic Theater by the Trax in St Mary's Georgia, and the historic Sun Ray Cinema in Jacksonville Florida. Several news articles and online magazines describe the film's shooting and international film festival participation around the world.

Plot
"An old lover gentleman, Joe, goes to great lengths to set up his perfect wedding anniversary, but his plan is botched when his car won't start. Stranded and in a frenzy about ruining his special day, he reluctantly takes a ride from a good Samaritan, Bob who turns out to be an undercover police officer. Along the way, Joe portrays signs of anxiety and even confusion to the point that when Bob drops him off, he's a bit concerned. Joe enjoys the day with his lover, until our good Samaritan shows up at the door. Bob has had his car fixed and towed to the house as a gesture of kindness but Bob's the last one Joe wants to see at his door. What is he hiding? Bob is truly concerned, but his concern could turn Joe's whole life upside down!"

International Film Festival Participations
 Waco Family & Faith International Film Festival, Waco, Texas, USA, February 2020
 Lifft India Filmotsav World Cine Fest, Malavli Pune, India, December 2019
 Helsinki Education Film Festival International, Helsinki, Finland, September 2019
 Forwardian International Film Festival, Stroudburg, Pennsylvania, USA, September 2019
 Branson International Film Festival, Branson, Missouri, USA, April 2019 
 Indie Best Film Festival, Santa Monica, California, USA, July 2018
 San Benedetto Film Fest, San Benedetto, Italy, July 2018
 San Mauro Film Festival, Turin, Italy, May 2018
 International Short Film Festival Kalmthout Belgium, Belgium, October 2017
 Kill Jim International Film Festival, Siracusa, Italy, July 2017
 Five Continents International Film Festival, Puerto La Cruz, Venezuela, July 2017 
 Coastal Georgia Film Festival, St. Mary, GA, USA, June 2017
 Barcelona Planet Film Festival, Barcelona, Spain, May 2017
 Red Corner International Film Festival, Borgholm, Sweden, July 2017
 Phoenix International Film Festival Melbourne, Melbourne, Australia, March 2017
 UK Screen One International Film Festival, Leicester & Nottingham, United Kingdom, March 2017
 Cosmic Film Festival, City Walk, Orlando, Florida, USA, February 2017
 Los Angeles CineFest International Film Festival, Santa Monica, CA, USA, January 2017
 Mediterranean Film Festival (MedFF), in Sicily, Italy, 2017
 14th Central Michigan International Film Festival 2017, Michigan, USA, February 2017  
 17th Woodstock Museum International Film Festival, Woodstock, NY, USA, Sep 2016 
 15th Broadway International Film Festival, LA, USA., Aug 2016 
 Feel the Reel International Film Festival, Glasgow, United Kingdom, Sep 2016
 17th Woodstock Museum International Film Festival, in Woodstock, NY, USA, Sep 2016
 IndieWise Virtual International Film Festival, Miami, Florida, USA, Sept 2016
 Indigo Moon International Film Festival, Fayetteville, NC, USA, Oct 7-9, 2016 
 Davis International Film Festival, Davice, California, USA, October 2016 
 10th El Ojo Cojo International Film Festival, Madrid, Spain, November 2016
 Tampa Bay Underground Film Festival, Tampa, Florida, USA, December 2016

Awards and Nominees

 Award Winner of the Best Lead Actor (Jerry Wisner) at the "Branson International Film Festival", Branson, Missouri, USA, 2019
 Semi-Finalist for the Best Short Fiction Film (Mahmoud Shoolizadeh) at the "Liffet India Filmotsav World Cine Fest", Malavli Pune, India, December 2019
 Nominee for the Best Short Fiction Film (Mahmoud Shoolizadeh) at the "Branson International Film Festival", Branson, Missourie, USA, April 2019
 Nominee for the Best Lead Actor as the Joe (Jerry Wisner) at the "Branson International Film Festival", Branson, Missourie, USA, April 2019
 Nominee for the Best Lead Actress as the Melody (Stevie Conway) at the "Branson International Film Festival", Branson, Missourie, USA, April 2019
 Nominee for the Best Feature Film at the San Benedetto Film Festival, San Benedetto, Italy, July 2018
 Nominee for the Best Feature Film at the San Mauro Film Festival, Turin, Italy, May 2018
 Award for the Best Fiction Film at the Kill Jim International Film Festival, Siracusa, Italy, July 2017
 Finalist for the Best Fiction Film at the Davis International Film Festival, Los Angeles, California, USA, Oct 2016 
 Award for the Best Fiction Half-Length Film at the Five Continents International Film Festival, Puerto La Cruz, Venezuela, June 2017.
 Award for the Best Story at the Red Corner Film Festival, Sweden, June 2017 
 Award for the Best Poster at the Five Continents International Film Festival, Puerto La Cruz, Venezuela, June 2017 
 Nominee for the Best Fiction film (Mahmoud Shoolizadeh) at the "Grand IndieWise Convention International Film Festival", Miami, Florida, USA, Sept 2016
 Nominee for Best Narrative Feature Film at the Barcelona Planet Film Festival, Barcelona, Spain, May 2017

References

External links 
 
 Official Festivals and Awards section of the Film's website: http://www.shoolizadeh.com/the-lover-festivals-awards

2016 films
2010s English-language films